President is an honorific title in the Church of Jesus Christ of Latter-day Saints (LDS Church) given to men who hold certain priesthood leadership positions.

General leaders 
The title of "President" is given to a number of general leaders of the LDS Church. The President of the Church and his counselors in the First Presidency are usually referred to as "President". The President of the Quorum of the Twelve Apostles is referred to as "President", as is the Acting President of the Quorum of the Twelve Apostles (if any). Historically, the Assistant President of the Church was also given this title.

Local leaders 
The title of "President" is given to a number of local leaders of the LDS Church. Presidents of stakes, missions, districts, and temples are referred to as "President", as are their two counselors. A branch president is given the title "President", but his counselors in the branch presidency are not. Similarly, presidents of the church's elders, teachers, and deacons quorums are given the title of "President", though their counselors are not.

Presidents not given the title 
The seven members of the Presidency of the Seventy are given the honorific title "Elder" rather than "President", even though they are the presidents of the church's quorums of the Seventy. Men who serve in general or local presidencies of the Young Men or the Sunday School are not referred to as "President"; instead "Brother" is used, which is the common courtesy title for all adult male members. 

Traditionally, women who act as general or local presidents of the Relief Society, Young Women, and Primary are not referred to as "President"; instead "Sister" is used, which is the common courtesy title for all adult female members. However, Jean B. Bingham, who has been general president of the Relief Society since 2017, has been referred to as "President Bingham" by official church sources.

See also 
 Index of religious honorifics and titles § Latter Day Saints

Notes

References 
D. Michael Quinn (1997, 3rd ed). The Mormon Hierarchy: Extension of Power (Salt Lake City, Utah: Signature Books)

Ecclesiastical titles
Latter Day Saint hierarchy

 
Latter Day Saint terms